Short track speed skating at the 2013 European Youth Olympic Winter Festival is held at the Poiana Brașov Ice Rink in the National Sports Complex Poiana Brașov at Poiana Brașov, Romania from 17 to 19 February 2013.

Results

Medal table

Men's events

Ladies events

Mixed events

References

External links
Results
The Venue at EYOWF 2013 | Photo Gallery
EYOWF 2013 - Presentation Video at YouTube
EYOWF 2013 - Facilities Presentation at YouTube

2013 in short track speed skating
2013 European Youth Olympic Winter Festival events
2013